Ada, abbreviated as Ada in horticultural trade, is a genus of 16 species in the orchid family (Orchidaceae), subfamily Epidendroideae, tribe Cymbidieae, subtribe Oncidiinae, alliance Oncidium. The type species is Ada aurantiaca.

These are epiphytic or lithophytic orchids. They are native to Nicaragua down to northern South America, down the Andes to Bolivia. They are warm to cool-growing plants to be found in wet, montane forests at higher elevations, between 650 and 2700 m, but most between 1800 and 2200 m.

The lanceolate leaves are distichous (growing in two ranks) with a length of 20 cm, growing on pseudobulbs with a maximum length of 10 cm. The foliaceous leaf sheaths are well-developed.

The pendent and spectacularly colorful inflorescences do not grow above the leaves. They can produce up to 15 fragrant flowers, blooming from January till April. The color can vary from white to greenish and orange. The perianth is narrow and pointed, with almost similar sepals and petals. The floral bracts are large and inflated.

The lip is reflexed. It bears a basal callus made up of two plates. It often ends in two tooth-like mounds.

Ada uses a "pseudoparasitism" method of attracting parasite pollinators, by mimicking their host.

They are not easy to cultivate, because of their high demands.

References 

 Williams, N. H. 1972. A reconsideration of Ada and the glumaceous brassias. Brittonia 24: 93–110.

External links 
 
 
  Ada aurantiaca Orchid

Oncidiinae genera
Epiphytic orchids
Oncidiinae